François-Séraphin Delpech (1778 – 25 April 1825) was a French artist and lithographer.

Delpech served as an art critic for the Mercure de France during the period of the First French Empire. In 1818, he opened a printmaking studio in Paris. From 1819 onward, Delpech produced lithographic portraits of a number of leading figures of his time. Today, Delpech's works are held in the Bibliothèque nationale de France; the National Portrait Gallery, London; the Fine Arts Museums of San Francisco; and the Musée de la Révolution française.

Selected works

French lithographers
1778 births
1825 deaths